The Southwest Washington Regional Transportation Council (SWRTC) is the metropolitan planning organization for southwestern Washington state, including parts of the Portland, Oregon metropolitan area. It oversees long-range planning and transportation funding for Clark, Klickitat, and Skamania counties. SWRTC was established in 1992 under the provisions of the 1990 Washington State Growth Management Act.

References

Metropolitan planning organizations